Avram is a surname. It is related to the surname Abram, which means exalted father. People with the surname Avram include:

 Alexandru Avram (born 1991), Romanian footballer
 Ben Avram (born 1941), Indian Israeli painter
 Constantin Avram (1911–1987), Romanian engineer
 Elli Avram (born 1990), Swedish-Greek actress
 Henriette Avram (1919–2006), computer programmer and systems analyst
 Herbert Avram (1913–2006), American chess player
 Ionuț Avram (born 1979), Romanian footballer
 Răzvan Avram (born 1986), Romanian footballer
 Sorin Avram (born 1943), former Romanian football player and coach
 Andreas Avraam (born 1987), Cypriot football player

See also
Avram (given name)

Hebrew-language surnames
Romanian-language surnames